Uleodothis is a genus of fungi in the family Venturiaceae.

The genus was circumscribed by Ferdinand Theissen and Hans Sydow in Ann. Mycol. vol.13 on page 305 in 1915.

The genus name of Uleodothis is in honour of Ernst Heinrich Georg Ule (1854–1915), who was a German botanist and plant collector.

Species
As accepted by Species Fungorum;
 Uleodothis balansiana 
 Uleodothis coonoorensis 
 Uleodothis eupatoriicola 
 Uleodothis indica 
 Uleodothis munkii 
 Uleodothis paspali 
 Uleodothis pteridis 
 Uleodothis rhynchosporae 

Former species;
 U. andina  = Achorella andina, Dothideomycetes family
 U. aphanes  = Tomasellia aphanes, Naetrocymbaceae family
 U. tamarindi  = Stigmochora controversa, Phyllachoraceae family

References

External links
Uleodothis at Index Fungorum

Venturiaceae